Mario Armando Moine (born 13 November 1949) is an Argentine politician and businessman.

Moine worked for the supermarket chain Los Hermanitos, and sold his holdings in the company in 1998 to invest in the InterTower hotel. He was affiliated with the Justicialist Party while serving as mayor of Paraná from 1987 to 1991, and as Governor of Entre Ríos Province between 1991 and 1995. Moine withdrew from politics in 2003, after his immediate successor as mayor, won Justicialist backing to run for a second term. Moine announced in July 2020 that he would return to politics, without formally participating in the Justicialist Party or actively campaigning for public office.

Moine's son Mario Gabriel Moine began his own political career in 2015.

References

1949 births
Living people
Mayors of places in Argentina
20th-century Argentine politicians
Governors of Entre Ríos Province 
20th-century Argentine businesspeople
21st-century Argentine businesspeople
21st-century Argentine politicians
People from Paraná, Entre Ríos
Businesspeople in the food industry
Hoteliers